Aimé Venel (born May 8, 1950) is a French painter and drawer who focuses on figurative and symbolist style. He creates his own style of figurative arts elegance that primarily lies between symbolist painting and expressionism art, closely related to romanticism (French:Figuration des temps nouveaux). He is a self-taught man whose artwork is influenced by women's beauty. Aimé Venel was a Scientologist for years, before withdrawing from the movement.

Biography
In 1972, Aimé Venel was introduced to Pierre Yves Trémois and thereafter he became Edouard Mac’Avoy's student. Between 1974 and 1978, Aimé Venel was a part of Mac’Avoy's workshop from where he learned his style and mastered his drawing skills.
In 1975, he exhibited first personal collection in Barbizon. Between 1986 and 2000 he worked on a huge triptych (12metre by 3metre) called Pour le chant des oiseaux (For the birds song). This artwork was recognized as the road from the spirituality to materialism passing through the aestheticism to pay tribute to the woman.
In 2001 he decorated Villa in Miami with some big paintings including Version Paradis (2mx3,90m), Terre Conquise (2metre by 2,70metre) and Aux sources de la musique (diptych, 2metre by 2,7metre). He also worked on another triptych called Biothèque Evolution (81cmx2m) that reflects the evolution of mankind on earth and pays tribute to the scientific research.

Principal work
His principal work is characterized by lyric compositions and some of them are as follows:
 2011: Les Amours Légendaires II
 2004/2005: Contes et Légendes (Sleeping Beauty, Bluebeard, Ruy Blas and The Queen of Spain, Isis and Osiris, Le Miracle des Loups, Peter Pan, Le Rouge et le Noir, Amour et Psyché, Notre Dame de Paris
 1998: La Musique
 1997: Les Amours légendaires, (Romeo and Juliet, The Beauty and the Beast, Lancelot & Guenièvre, Pierrot & Colombine, Tristan & Iseult, The Minotaur, Hamlet & Ophelia, The Myth of Pygmalion, Orphée & Eurydice
 1997: Venice and its carnival

Exhibitions
Aimé Venel has participated in following exhibitions.

 2013: Idecor Art Gallery Switzerland, permanent exhibition
 2012: Exhibition at Hôtel Lotti Paris “ Paris et les Amours Légendaires “
 2011: Exhibition Galerie 104 L’Atelier du Peintre, Village Suisse, Paris
 2011: Exhibition Lakind Fine Art, Santa Fé, New Mexico, USA, Hotel NH Atlanta, Bruxelles
 2010: Exhibition Lakind Fine Art, Santa Fé, New Mexico, USA
 2010: Exhibition Hôtel Horset Opéra, Paris, France
 2009: Hôtel Le Lotti, Paris, France «Hommage à René Barjavel»,
 2009: Hôtel NH Atlanta, Bruxelles, Belgique
 2008: Hôtel Le Lotti, Paris, France
 2008: Galerie Saint-Roch, Paris, France
 2008: Le Colombier de Corvol, Nièvre, France
 2008: Hôtel NH Atlanta (Bruxelles, Belgique)
 2008: 4th China (Shenzhen) International Cultural Industries Fair avec la Art64 Gallery
 2008: Hôtel L’Horset Opéra, Paris, France
 2008: Atom Space Gallery, Canton, Chine
 2008: Galerie Princesse de Kiev, Nice, France
 2008: Art64 Gallery, Canton, Chine
 2008: Artexpo with la galerie Behr-Thyssen, New-York, USA
 2007: Galerie Princesse de Kiev, Nice, France
 2007:Mallorca Art Consulting, Baleares, Espagne
 2007: Guangzhou International Art Fair avec la Art64 Gallery, Canton, Chine
 2007: Galerie Arte Um Lugar ao Sol, Curitiba, Brésil
 2007: Salon de la SNBA (Société Nationale des Beaux-Arts) au Carrousel du Louvre, Paris, France
 2007: Art en Capital 2007 au Grand Palais, Paris, France
 2007: Joy Gallery, Key West, Florida, USA
 2007:Jolly Hotel du Grand Sablon, Bruxelles, Belgique
 2007: Hôtel L’Horset Opéra, Paris, France
 2006: Château des Tourelles, Plessis-Trévise, France
 2006: Jolly Hotel Lotti, Paris, France
 2005: Guest of Honor at the  «83e Salon de Fontenay-le-Fleury», France
 2005: Hôtel L’Horset Opéra, Paris, France
 2005: Jolly Hotel Lotti, Paris, France
 2005: Galerie mouvances, Place des Vosges, Paris, France
 2004: Galerie Atezart, Avignon, France
 2004: La Galerie, Luxembourg, Luxembourg
 2004: Galerie Lacydon, Marseille, France
 1999: B and R Art Gallery, Californie, USA
 1999: Galerie Gewehr, Allemagne
 1999: Galerie du Chêne, Lausanne, Suisse
 1998: Château de Clermont, Haute-Savoie, France
 1998: Abbaye de Talloires, Haute-Savoie, France
 1997: Italian Chamber of Commerce, Paris, France
 1997: Hôtel Régina, Paris, France
 1994: Galerie Art Monet, Guatemala
 1993: Galerie AJL, Paris, France
 1992: Galerie Marc Estel, Osaka Fu, Japon
 1992: Galerie Guigné, Paris, France
 1991: Galerie Sainte-Catherine, Honfleur, France
 1990: Galerie Art Dépôt, Paris, France
 1988: Galerie Calisto, Paris, France
 1988: Société SOMAT,  France
 1987: Hôtel de l’Etrier, Crans-Montana, Suisse
 1986: Galerie Aimé Venel in Montmartre, Paris, France
 1986: Société Pernoderie, Créteil, France
 1986: Garden's Hotel, Lisieux, France
 1986: Swissair Company, Genève, Suisse
 1985: Casino de Pornichet, France
 1984: Galerie du Musée, Paris, France
 1984: Galerie des Colonies, Nantes, France
 1983: Galerie Aurélia Antiquités, Milly-la-Forêt, France
 1982: Galerie l’Oriflamme, Paris, France
 1981: Galerie Dandoy, Belgique
 1981: Guest of Honor at la Taverne aux poètes, Angers, France
 1980: Festival international de Tarascon, France
 1979: Galerie Michel Perrier, Châteaurenard, France
 1979: Musée d’Yvoire, Haute-Savoie, France
 1975: Barbizon, le village des peintres, à la Galerie Present Art, France

Awards and recognition
 2001: Entry in the Drouot Cotation's dictionary
 1996: Prix du Maire (Parix Xe)
 1991: Entry in the book "Prestige de la Peinture et de la Sculpture d'aujourd'hui dans le monde"
 1989: Entry in the "Who's Who in international Art"
 1985: Silver Medal by Salon des Artistes Français
 1981: Honorable Mention by Salon des Artistes Français

References

External links
 Official Website

20th-century French painters
20th-century French male artists
French male painters
21st-century French painters
21st-century French male artists
French draughtsmen
1950 births
Living people